Harald Rosenløw Eeg (born 18 August 1970) is a Norwegian novelist and script writer. He made his literary début in 1995 with the youth novel Glasskår, for which he was awarded the Tarjei Vesaas' debutantpris. Eeg also wrote the script for a film with the same name from 2002. He wrote the script for Hawaii, Oslo, directed by Erik Poppe and released in 2004, and for the film Uro from 2006, directed by Stefan Faldbakken. The 2008 film Troubled Water, directed by Poppe, was based on a script by Eeg. The film won the audience prize for best narrative feature film at the 16th Hamptons International Film Festival in 2008.

Eeg was awarded the Brage Prize in 2004 for the youth novel Yatzy.

References

1970 births
20th-century Norwegian novelists
21st-century Norwegian novelists
Living people